Cardamine quinquefolia, the five-leaved cuckoo flower or whorled coral-root, is a species of flowering plant in the family Brassicaceae, native to an area from south eastern Europe to northern Iran. 

The Latin specific epithet quinquefolia means "with five-lobed leaves". The whole plant dies down in summer.

This plant is used as groundcover in gardens. It has received the Royal Horticultural Society's Award of Garden Merit. It prefers a sheltered spot in full or partial shade.

References

quinquefolia
Flora of Southeastern Europe
Flora of Iran